The Hippodrome Theatre (locally known as The Hippodrome or The Hipp) is a regional professional theatre in downtown Gainesville, Florida, United States. It was founded in 1973 by local actors and was added to the U.S. National Register of Historic Places on July 10, 1979.

History

U.S. Post Office and District Courthouse
The building itself was completed in 1911, and served as a U.S. Post Office (on the first floor) and a Courthouse of the United States District Court for the Northern District of Florida (on the second floor).

Interior design
The present-day interior maintains much of the original walls, doors and beams from its post office and courthouse era.  The Hippodrome building also has one of the oldest working elevators in Florida which requires the operator to manually close the screen, the door, and then pull a crank to operate.

Modern renovations
In 2013, due to the imminent discontinuation of 35 mm movie film, the theater used a combination of grant funding and a Kickstarter project to help fund its transition to digital projectors, which it estimated to cost $40,000.

The theater received a series of renovations in 2020, which included lobby improvements, better indoor and outdoor lighting, new speakers, and improved air conditioning. These renovations cost the theater over $324,000 and were partially funded by Wild Spaces & Public Places, a 2016 Alachua County tax initiate.

Operations

The Hippodrome uses professional actors and has its own set designers, costume designers, sound engineers and lighting engineers for each of its main stage productions. It also provides youth theater education classes. The Hippodrome features Broadway and off Broadway productions and art house films.

The Hippodrome provides arts education for all ages, including classes & camps, in-school programs, workshops and behind-the-scenes opportunities for adults.

It is a relatively small location, with a 268-seat thrust stage main stage theater on the second floor and 80-seat cinema space on the first floor.

References

External links

 Hippodrome Theatre
 Alachua County listings at Florida's Office of Cultural and Historical Programs
 Virtual tour of Downtown Gainesville and Related Structures at Alachua County's Department of Growth Management

1973 establishments in Florida
Buildings and structures in Gainesville, Florida
Courthouses on the National Register of Historic Places in Florida
Culture of Gainesville, Florida
National Register of Historic Places in Gainesville, Florida
Post office buildings on the National Register of Historic Places in Florida
Theatres on the National Register of Historic Places in Florida
Tourist attractions in Gainesville, Florida